The Washington Avenue Bridge in Waco, Texas was built in 1902 and was then the longest single-span vehicular truss bridge in Texas.  It has a  span across the Brazos River.  It provided for traffic circulation in addition to that provided by the 1870-built Waco Suspension Bridge one block downriver (east).

The bridge cost $93,399 for its construction, not including $1,850 for railings and approach spans. Its cost was split by McLennan County and the City of Waco, which became equal owners.

A Black man named Sank Majors was lynched at the bridge in 1905, hung from a crossbeam by a white mob. Another Black man, Jim Lawyer, was attacked for objecting to the lynching. Texas Rangers looked on the violence and did not intervene.

The bridge was listed on the National Register of Historic Places in 1998.

See also

National Register of Historic Places listings in McLennan County, Texas
List of bridges on the National Register of Historic Places in Texas

References

External links

Road bridges on the National Register of Historic Places in Texas
Buildings and structures in Waco, Texas
Bridges completed in 1902
Transportation in McLennan County, Texas
National Register of Historic Places in McLennan County, Texas
Pennsylvania truss bridges in the United States